Akner may refer to:

Akner, Lori, Armenia
Akner, Syunik, Armenia
Akner monastery, Turkey

See also
Ackner